The Southern Oregon Heat was a professional indoor football team based out of Medford, Oregon, founded in 2000.  They were a member of the National Indoor Football League and played their home games at Compton Arena (now the Seven Feathers Event Center)  at the Jackson County Expo & Fairgrounds in Central Point, Oregon.  They were owned by Kevin Wells.

History
The Heat were founded on July 1, 2000, by Sutherlin, Oregon, businessman Kevin Wells bringing professional indoor football to the Rogue Valley for the first time.  They were originally to have become a member of the American Indoor Football League, but opted for the NIFL instead.  They had two head coaches during their one season with the NIFL.  The starting quarterback throughout the season was Eric VanderWegen, who would later become head coach midway through the season.  The team amassed a record of only 1-13 (1-7 at home and 0-6 on the road).  The team averaged an attendance of only 1,469 fans.  The team failed to pay its rental fees to the Expo before the final scheduled home game of the season and were forced to cancel that game, which was a forfeit loss.  They essentially ceased operations after their last road game.

They were to have resurfaced as the Eugene Mercury in 2002, but owner Wells was unable to find a new owner and the team folded before the season started.

References

National Indoor Football League teams
Defunct American football teams in Oregon
2000 establishments in Oregon
Sports in Medford, Oregon
2001 disestablishments in Oregon
American football teams established in 2000
American football teams disestablished in 2001